Hung Yan-yan (born 25 February 1962, also credited as 熊欣欣 or Xiong Xin Xin) is a Hong Kong martial artist, actor, stuntman and action director originally from Liuzhou, Guangxi, China. He was the stunt double for martial arts superstar Jet Li.

Early life
Hung was born in Liuzhou, Guangxi, China in 1962. He was placed in a martial arts school at age 12 after he was taken away from school. Hung trained for 12 years and won multiple championships.

Film career
After training, he went to Hong Kong and was discovered by famous filmmaker Lau Kar-leung, who was at that time filming Martial Arts of Shaolin starring Jet Li, and hired Hung as Li's stunt double. He then moved to Hong Kong in 1988. There, Hung became a stuntman, later an actor and action director. He had small roles as an actor.

Later, Hung was Jet Li's stunt double in Once Upon a Time in China. Some of the action scenes were too dangerous for Li because of an ankle injury. Hung was then Li's stunt double again in the sequel, Once Upon a Time in China II. He was also featured a role as the leader of the White Lotus Sect, Kau-kung "Priest" Gao.

He featured in Once Upon a Time in China III as Kwai Geuk-Chat known as "Clubfoot Seven" Chiu-Tsat. He was so nicknamed due to his disability, being the seventh member of wealthy rival martial artist, Chiu Tin-bak's gang. A fighting enforcer, he fights Wong Fei-hung (Li), loses and is terribly injured after Leung Foon (Max Mok) accidentally releases a stampede of horses from a stable. Clubfoot Seven is then kicked out and abandoned by his former master, Chiu Tin-bak when he called his student Clubfoot a "useless cripple", and becomes discipled to Wong instead. Despite his clubfoot, he showcases his skills which includes his electrifying acrobats and moves. Hung reprised his role as Clubfoot in the next two sequels which do not feature Li, instead it featured Vincent Zhao, who was much younger than Li and more physical so Hung was not much featured as a stunt double. He reprised his role again in the Once Upon a Time in China TV series and in Once Upon a Time in China and America which again features Jet Li and is the last of the Once Upon a Time in China series.

He was the main villain, Prince Twelve, in Yuen Wo Ping's Hero Among Heroes starring Donnie Yen. His role was first a friend of Yen's character, who turns him into a drug addict and later betrays him.

Hung also followed Tsui Hark to Hollywood in 1998, making a brief performance in Double Team.

After working briefly in Hollywood, he returned to Hong Kong. Hung was action director in Chin Siu-tung's Blacksheep Affair and again in Tsui Hark's 2000 film, Time and Tide starring Nicholas Tse.

He later returned to Hollywood as stunt choreographer for The Musketeer.

Personal life
Hung is married to Carrie Choy, a former actress, and they have one child. He learned English by reading books.

Filmography

Actor

 Shaolin Temple (1982) – Shaolin student
 Kids From Shaolin (1984) – Shaolin student
 Martial Arts of Shaolin (1986) – Shaolin student
 Tiger on the Beat (1988) – extra/stuntman
 City Cops (1989) – Shikamuka's thug
 Ghost Ballroom (1989) – Mr Lo's thug
 Aces Go Places V (1989) – Thai horse rider
 God of Gamblers (1989) – Shing's man
 Stage Door Johnny (1990) – troublemaker at restaurant
 Tiger on the Beat 2 (1990)
 Skinny Tiger and Fatty Dragon (1990) – Robber
 Bullet for Hire (1991) – extra
 Lee Rock II (1991) – Shrimp Head / Lu
 Once Upon a Time in China (1991) – Shaho gang member
 Once Upon a Time in China II (1992) – Kau-kung (Priest Gao)
 Royal Tramp (1992) – flag holder
 The Musical Vampire (1992)
 Forced Nightmare (1992)
 New Dragon Gate Inn (1992)
 Once Upon a Time in China III (1993) – Kwai Geuk-Chat (Clubfoot Seven Chiu-Tsat)
 Hero Among Heroes (1993) – Prince Barac of Twelve
 Millionaire Cop (1993) – Robber
 Once Upon a Time in China IV (1993) – Kwai Geuk-Chat (Clubfoot Seven Chiu-Tsat)
 To Live and Die in Tsimshatsui (1994) – Bald rascal
 The Other Side of the Sea (1994)
 Once Upon a Time in China V (1994) – Kwai Geuk-Chat (Clubfoot Seven Chiu-Tsat)
 Wonder Seven (1994) – Shaolin Monk
 The Chinese Feast (1995) – Chef Wong Wing
 The Blade (1995) – Fei Lung / Flying Dragon (Falcon)
 The Little Drunken Masters (1995)
 Fist of Fury (1995)
 Wong Fei Hung Series (1996) – Kwai Geuk-Chat (Clubfoot Seven Chiu-Tsat)
 Tristar (1996) – Loanshark Tai
 Black Mask (1996) – Jimmy
 Once Upon a Time in China and America (1997) – Kwai Geuk-Chat (Clubfoot Seven Chiu-Tsat)
 Double Team (1997) - Stavros' Man in hotel
 Till Death Do Us Part (1998)- Bill
 The Blacksheep Affair (1998) – Captain Kiang
 Star Runner (2003) – Spectator irritating Prof. Cheung
 In the Blue (2006)
 Playboy Cops (2008) – Scorpion Yong
 The Butterfly Lovers (2008) – Martial Arts Teacher
 Coweb (2009) – Brief Appearance, Club Manager
 Vampire Warriors (2010)
 Bad Blood (2010) – Kong
 Shaolin (2011) – Sou Xiang Tu
 All Men Are Brothers (2011) – Luan Tingyu
 The Woman Knight of Mirror Lake (2011)
 Tai Chi 0 (2012)
 Tai Chi Hero (2012)
 Glory Days (2012)
 Ip Man: The Final Fight (2013)
 The Master (2015)
 Trivisa (2016)
 The Hidden Sword (2017)
 Our Time Will Come (2017)
 Fate Crisis (2018)
 Kung Fu League (2018)
 Swordsman Nice Kung Fu (2019)
 Assassins and the Missing Gold (2019)

Stuntman
 Once Upon a Time in China III (1993)
 Once Upon a Time in China (1992)
 Once Upon a Time in China (1991)
 Tiger Cage 2 (1990)
 Tiger On The Beat 2 (1990)
 City Cops (1989)
 Tiger On The Beat (1988)
 Yellow River Fighter (1988)

Action director
 Tiger on the Beat 2 (1990)
 Skinny Tiger, Fatty Dragon (1990)
 Wonder Seven (1994)
 Tristar (1996)
 ...Till Death Do Us Part (1998)
 Time and Tide (2000)
 Reunion (2002)
 Seven Swords (2005)
 In the Blue (2006)
 Coweb (2009)

Assistant action director
 Aces Go Places V (1989)
 Once Upon a Time in China (1991)
 Dragon Inn (1992)
 Once Upon a Time in China IV (1993)
 Once Upon a Time in China and America (1997)
 The Blacksheep Affair (1998)

Director
 Coweb (2009)

Executive producer
 Into the Blue (2006)

References

External links
 Hung Yan-yan at Hong Kong Cinemagic
 
 Hung Yan-yan at HKMDB

1962 births
Hong Kong kung fu practitioners
20th-century Hong Kong male actors
21st-century Hong Kong male actors
Hong Kong male film actors
Living people
Hong Kong stunt performers
Sportspeople from Guangxi
Male actors from Guangxi
Film directors from Guangxi
Hong Kong film producers
Hong Kong film directors